Thunder Mountain is a 1925 American drama film directed by Victor Schertzinger and written by Eve Unsell. It is based on the 1919 play Thunder by Peg Franklin and Elia W. Peattie. The film stars Madge Bellamy, Leslie Fenton, Alec B. Francis, Paul Panzer, Arthur Housman, and ZaSu Pitts. The film was released on October 11, 1925, by Fox Film Corporation.

Plot
In Thunder Mountain, the inhabitants are poor and illiterate. In the village ignorance reigns and only Si Pace, one who lives by lending money, owns a "book". A feud divides two families, the Martins and the Givens. The preacher convinces Sam Martin to leave the country to get an education elsewhere. The young man returned three years later, determined to build a school. But Pace refuses to lend him the necessary money. Sam meets Azalea, a young circus actress who has escaped the circus and the brutality of its owner. Dressed in sequins and in tights, the girl dances for Si Pace in a vain attempt to raise money for the school. Discovered by Sam who doubts her, Azalea decides to leave with Joe Givens but, before their escape, Joe robs and kills Si Pace. All the inhabitants believe that the culprit of the crime is Sam and are preparing to hang him. The preacher, to stop them, detonates some dynamite he had placed in the mountains, saying that the explosion is the wrath of God for their behavior. Joe, in terror, then confesses his crime. Sam and Azalea get married and the man finally manages to build his school.

Cast

Preservation
With no prints of Thunder Mountain located in any film archives, it is a lost film.

References

External links

Still at silentfilmstillarchive.com

1925 films
1920s English-language films
Silent American drama films
1925 drama films
Fox Film films
Films directed by Victor Schertzinger
American silent feature films
American black-and-white films
1920s American films